Nuffield Tools and Gauges Limited in England was a designer and manufacturer of specialised mass production plant for Morris Motors Limited and its subsidiaries. It also supplied outside customers.

Morris Motors Tools and Gauges branch

Formerly a branch activity within Morris Motors a separate company was incorporated and named Nuffield Tools and Gauges Limited to take over that branch business as of 31 December 1942. This followed acquisition of the Cheylesmore Coventry building. Once the home of the Swift Cycle Company and then in use as a factory making shells it had been badly damaged by repeated enemy action in 1940-1941.

Operations

Design and manufacture of plant
Designer and manufacturer of special-purpose machine tools and follow-through press tools including fixtures and jigs as well as small tools and gauges

Manufacture of prototypes
They also made prototype parts for any mechanism required.

Dissolution
Nuffield Tools and Gauges Limited was dissolved in 1974.

See also
Industrial engineering

References
 The Papers of Nuffield Tools and Gauges Limited, Reference GB 0152 MSS.226/NT. Modern Records Centre, University of Warwick Library. This collection forms part of the British Motor Industry Heritage Trust Archive.

1942 establishments in England
Manufacturing companies disestablished in 1974
Coventry motor companies
Defunct companies based in the West Midlands (county)
Defunct engineering companies of the United Kingdom
Defunct manufacturing companies of the United Kingdom
British companies established in 1942
Manufacturing companies established in 1942
1974 disestablishments in England